Eric Butorac and Bobby Reynolds were the defending champions, but Butorac competed in the BNP Paribas Open instead and chose to not participate this year.
Reynolds partnered up by André Sá. However, they lost to Lukáš Dlouhý and Leander Paes in the semifinal.
Martin Damm and Filip Polášek won in the final 4–6, 6–1, [13–11], against Dlouhý and L Paes.

Seeds

Draw

Draw

External links
 Main Draw

BMW Tennis Championship - Doubles
BMW Tennis Championship